The 2016 Saint Louis FC season was the franchise's second season in the United Soccer League, the third division of soccer in the United States.

After playing their first season in the Eastern Conference of the USL, due to the addition of new teams to the league the club moved to the Western Conference for 2016.

The club also renewed their affiliation with the Chicago Fire of Major League Soccer for the 2016 season, having partnered with them the previous year.

Current squad
Where a player has not declared an international allegiance, nation is determined by place of birth.
As of May 21, 2016.
Sources:

Player movement

Returning Players from 2015

Notes

New Signings

Academy Signings

Loans

In

Out

United Soccer League season

Preseason

Results summary

Matches

Standings

Western Conference Table

U.S. Open Cup

Matches

Player statistics

Goals

Assists

Shutouts

Kit
Supplier: Nike / Sponsor: Electrical Connection, NECA/IBEW Local 1

References

Saint Louis FC seasons
Saint Louis
Saint Louis FC
Saint Louis FC